The Ford Thunderbird (colloquially called the T-Bird) is a personal luxury car produced by Ford from model years 1955 until 1997 and 2002 until 2005 across 11 distinct generations. Introduced as a two-seat convertible, the Thunderbird was produced in a variety of body configurations. These included a four-seat hardtop coupe, four-seat convertible, five-seat convertible and hardtop, four-door pillared hardtop sedan, six-passenger hardtop coupe, and five-passenger pillared coupe, with the final generation designed again as a two-seat convertible.

Ford targeted the two-seat Thunderbird as an upscale model, but the 1958 model year design introduced a rear seat and arguably marked the expansion of a market segment eventually known as personal luxury cars. This class of cars was positioned to emphasize driving comfort and convenience features over handling and high-speed performance. From 1968 through 1998, Lincoln-Mercury marketed rebadged variants of the Thunderbird as the Continental Mark III, Mark IV, Mark V, Mercury Cougar, Lincoln Mark VII, and Lincoln Mark VIII.

Overview
The Thunderbird entered production for the 1955 model year as a sporty two-seat convertible. Unlike the Chevrolet Corvette, it was not marketed as a sports car.  Ford positioned the Thunderbird as an upscale model and it is credited in developing a new market segment, the personal luxury car. For 1958, the Thunderbird was redesigned with a second row of seats. Succeeding generations became larger until the line was downsized in 1977, again in 1980, and once again in 1983. Sales were good until the 1990s when large two-door coupes became unpopular. Thunderbird production ceased at the end of 1997. Production of a revived two-seat Thunderbird was launched for the 2002 model year and continued through the 2005 model year. From its introduction in 1955 to its final phaseout in 2005, Ford produced over 4.4 million Thunderbirds.

Convertible models
The second- to fourth-generation Thunderbird convertibles were similar in design to the Lincoln convertible of the time and used a design from earlier Ford Skyliner hardtop and convertible models. While these Thunderbird models had a true convertible soft top, the top was lowered to stow in the trunk area. This design reduced available trunk space when the top was down.

The trunk lid was rear-hinged that raised and lowered by hydraulic cylinders during the convertible top's up and down cycle. The forward end of the trunk lid contained a metal panel that extended upward to cover the area in which the top is stowed. No separate boot cover was needed between the back of the rear seat and the trunk lid when the soft top was retracted. 

This design could present challenges for troubleshooting a convertible top malfunction. The system consists of solenoids, relays, limit switches, electric motors, and a hydraulic pump/reservoir, as well as several hydraulic directional valves and cylinders. While the hydraulic system is not often a cause for trouble, electrical relays are known to fail. Malfunction of any of the numerous relays, motors, or limit switches prevents the convertible system from completing the cycle.

Unlike hardtop models that used a conventional key-secured, forward-hinged design, the convertibles combined the trunk opening and closing within the convertible top operating system.

Development
A smaller two-seater sports roadster was developed at the behest of Henry Ford II in 1953 called the Vega. The completed one-off generated interest at the time, but had meager power, European looks, and a correspondingly high cost, so it never proceeded to production. The Thunderbird was similar in concept, but was more American in style, more luxurious, and less sport-oriented.

Credit for the development of the original Thunderbird is given to Lewis Crusoe, a former GM executive lured out of retirement by Henry Ford II; George Walker, chief stylist and a Ford vice president; Frank Hershey, chief stylist for the Ford Division; Bill Boyer, designer for the Body Development Studio, who became the manager of the Thunderbird Studio in the spring of 1955; and Bill Burnett, chief engineer. Ford Designer William P. Boyer was the lead stylist on the original 1955 two-seater Thunderbird and also had input in the following series of Thunderbirds that included the 30th Anniversary Edition. Hershey's participation in the creation of the Thunderbird was more administrative than artistic. Crusoe and Walker met in France in October 1951. Walking in the Grand Palais in Paris, Crusoe pointed at a sports car and asked Walker, "Why can't we have something like that?" Some versions of the story claim that Walker replied by telling Crusoe, "Oh, we're working on it" ... although if anything existed at the time beyond casual dream-car sketches by members of the design staff, records of it have never come to light.

Walker promptly telephoned Ford's HQ in Dearborn and told designer Frank Hershey about the conversation with Crusoe. Hershey took the idea and began working on the vehicle. Crusoe saw a painted clay model on May 18, 1953, which corresponded closely to the final car; he gave the car the go-ahead in September after comparing it with current European trends. After Henry Ford II returned from the Los Angeles Auto Show (Autorama) in 1953, he approved the final design concept to compete with the then new Corvette.

The name was not among the thousands proposed, including rejected options such as Apache (the original name of the P-51 Mustang), Falcon (owned by Chrysler at the time), Eagle, Tropicale, Hawaiian, and Thunderbolt. A Ford stylist who had lived in the southwest submitted the Thunderbird name. The word "thunderbird" is a reference to a legendary creature for North American indigenous people. It is considered a supernatural bird of power and strength.

Thunderbird Country Club in Rancho Mirage, California, also lays claim to being the inspiration for the name of the car. According to it, Ernest Breech, a Thunderbird Country Club member who was then chairman of Ford Motor Company, was supposedly deeply involved in the creation of the Thunderbird. Breech, it is claimed, asked the Club's permission to use the name, which was granted.

Generations

First generation (1955–1957)

The Ford Thunderbird was introduced in February 1953 as a response to Chevrolet's new sports car, the Corvette, which was publicly unveiled in prototype form just a month before. Under rapid development, the Thunderbird went from idea to prototype in about a year, being unveiled to the public at the Detroit Auto Show on February 20, 1954. It was a two-seat design available with a detachable fiberglass hardtop and a folding fabric top. Production of the Thunderbird began on September 9 of that year, with the car beginning sales as a 1955 model on October 22, 1954. Though sharing some design characteristics with other Fords of the time such as single circular headlamps and tail lamps and modest tailfins, the Thunderbird was sleeker in shape and featured a hood scoop and a  speedometer not available on other Fords. It used mechanical components from mass-market Ford models. The Thunderbird's  wheelbase frame was a shortened version used in other Fords and the standard  Y-block V8 came from Ford's Mercury division.

Though inspired by and positioned directly against the Corvette, Ford billed the Thunderbird as a "personal luxury car|personal car,” putting a greater emphasis on the car's comfort and convenience features rather than its inherent sportiness. The Thunderbird sold exceptionally well in its first year, outselling the Corvette by more than 23-to-one in 1955 with 16,155 Thunderbirds sold vs. 700 Corvettes.  With the Thunderbird considered a success, few changes were made to the car for the 1956 model year. The most notable change was moving the spare tire to a Continental-style rear bumper to make more storage room in the trunk and a new 12-volt electrical system. The addition of the weight at the rear caused steering issues. Among the few other changes were new paint colors, the addition of standard circular porthole windows in the fiberglass roof to improve rearward visibility (with a delete option), and a  Y-block V8 rated at  when mated to a three-speed manual transmission or  when mated to a Ford-O-Matic three-speed automatic transmission; this transmission featured a "low gear", which was accessible manually via the gear selector. When in Drive, it was a two-speed automatic transmission (similar to Chevrolet's Powerglide). Low gear could also be accessed with wide open throttle. In 1956, Ford also added its new Lifeguard safety package.

The Thunderbird was revised for 1957 with a reshaped front bumper, a larger grille and tailfins, and larger tail lamps. The instrument panel was heavily restyled with round gauges in a single pod, and the rear of the car was lengthened, allowing the spare tire to be positioned back in the trunk. Though Ford was pleased to see sales of the Thunderbird rise to a record-breaking 21,380 units for 1957, company executives felt the car could do even better, leading to a substantial redesign of the car for 1958.

Second generation (1958–1960)

Although the 1955–57 Thunderbird was a success, Ford executives—particularly Robert McNamara—were concerned that the car's position as a two-seater limited its sales potential. As a result, the car was redesigned as a four-seater for 1958.

The new Thunderbird began a sales momentum previously unseen with the car, selling 200,000 units in three years, four times the result of the two-seat model. This success spawned a new market segment, the personal luxury car. It was the first individual model line (as opposed to an entire brand's line) to earn Motor Trend "Car of the Year" honors.

It was offered in both hardtop and convertible body styles, although the latter was not introduced until June 1958, five months after the release of the hardtop. The new Thunderbird was considerably larger than the previous generation, with a longer  wheelbase to accommodate the new back seat. Along with a new, more rigid unibody construction was new styling, including quad headlights, more prominent tailfins, a bolder chrome grille, and a larger, though nonfunctional, hood scoop. The engine was the new   FE V8 available with a three-speed manual or automatic transmissions. The 1958 model sales were 37,892 units an increase of 16,000 over the previous year.

For 1959, the Thunderbird featured a new grille and a newly optional   MEL V8 engine. Sales increased to 67,456 units. 

For the 1960 model year, the grille was again redesigned along with minor styling changes. A new option was a manually operated sunroof for hardtop models. The dual-unit round taillights featured on the 1958 and 1959 were changed to triple-units. Sales increased again with 92,843 sold for 1960.

Third generation (1961–1963)

The Thunderbird was redesigned for 1961 with styling that gave the car a unique bullet-like body side appearance. A new engine, the  FE V8, was the standard and only engine initially offered in the Thunderbird. The new Thunderbird was well received, with 73,051 sold for 1961.

The car was 1961's Indianapolis 500 pace car and was featured prominently in US President John F. Kennedy's inaugural parade, who appointed Ford executive Robert McNamara as secretary of defense. It also benefitted from product placement, notably on the popular television series 77 Sunset Strip.

A vinyl-roofed Landau option with simulated S-bars was added to the Thunderbird for 1962 as was a Sports Roadster package for convertible models. The Sports Roadster included 48-spoke Kelsey-Hayes-designed wire wheels and a special fiberglass tonneau cover for the rear seats, which gave the car the appearance of a two-seat roadster like the original Thunderbird. The Sports Roadster package was slow-selling due to the high price of the package and the complexity of the tonneau cover. Newly optional for 1962 was an upgraded version of the  V8 called the "M-Code" (a nickname used in reference to the letter M used as the engine code in the VIN in cars so equipped). A total of 200 M-Code V8 Thunderbirds sold between 1962 and 1963. For 1963 only, Y-code cars could come equipped with the same 390-cubic-inch V8 also equipped by the factory with tri-power carburetors only if the buyer desired air conditioning.

Few other changes were made to the Thunderbird for 1963, as Ford prepared to introduce a new version for 1964. A horizontal styling line was added that ran from the point where the bumper and fender meet back through the door and angled down. Small diagonal chrome bars were added in this area on the door. Alternators rather than generators were a new feature on all 1963 Thunderbirds.

Fourth generation (1964–1966)

For 1964, the Thunderbird was restyled in favor of a more squared-off appearance, which was mostly evident when viewing the car from the side or rear. Hinting at its roots in the previous generation of Thunderbird from which it evolved, the new model retained a similar grille design with quad headlights and a  wheelbase. As before, the new Thunderbird continued to be offered in hardtop, convertible, and Landau versions. The   FE V8 continued as the standard engine for the Thunderbird. It was paired with a three-speed automatic transmission. For 1965, sequential turn signals were added, flashing the individual segments of the broad, horizontal tail lights in sequences from inside to outside to indicate a turn. Also new for 1965 were standard front disc brakes, and doubled-sided keys.

Though it was the last year of the generation, 1966 had a stylistic revision for the Thunderbird highlighted by a new egg crate-style grille with a large Thunderbird emblem at its center and a single-blade front bumper. The rear bumper was restyled to include new full-width taillamps. Engine choices were also revised for 1966. Newly optional and taking the top position for performance was a   FE V8. The optional 428 cost only $86 over the base engine. This was the last year for the convertible until the "retro" models of 2002-05.

Fifth generation (1967–1971)

 1967–1969

The Thunderbird's fifth generation brought the second major change in the car's design direction since its debut in 1955. From 1958 through 1966, the Thunderbird had remained fundamentally the same in concept as a two-door coupe/convertible with two rows of seating. The introduction of the Ford Mustang in early 1964 created a challenge to the Thunderbird's market positioning. The Mustang was also a two-door coupe or convertible with two rows of seating at a substantially lower price. To prevent overlap, The Thunderbird was upsized, with a four-door option added.

The new Thunderbird was no longer unibody, but a body-on-frame construction with rubber mountings between the body and frame to reduce noise and vibration. In contrast to the previous generation of the Thunderbird was the discontinuation of a convertible model and the addition of a four-door hardtop coupe body style. The four-door featured suicide doors for rear-seat access and a very wide C-pillar that extended into the rear door window area. It was covered to match the standard vinyl top with simulated landau bars on the fixed pillar helping camouflage the cut line. A design feature of the fifth-generation Thunderbird was the full-width, fighter jet-inspired grille opening that incorporated hidden headlights.

 1970–1971

The 1970 model year Thunderbird continued with the same platform and many of the same parts and styling cues from the 1967 through 1969 models such as the sequential turn signals incorporated into the full-width tail lamps. The most noticeable change was in the front fascia, where a prominent projection somewhat resembling a bird's beak was added on the centerline, in line with long, angular lines in the hood. Semon "Bunkie" Knudsen, a former GM executive now president of Ford, is said to be responsible for this dramatic change. The T-bird was offered in coupe or sports-back models for these two years, the latter being a further distinction from the 1967 through 1969 models.

In 1971, Neiman Marcus offered "his and hers" Thunderbirds in its 1970 catalog, with telephones, tape recorders, and other features. The 1971 Thunderbird was mostly a carry-over from the 1970 model as Ford prepared to release a new, larger Thunderbird for 1972. It was also the last year to offer a four-door.

Sixth generation (1972–1976)

The sixth generation of the Thunderbird debuted in the fall of 1971 as a 1972 model.

Matching the large size of the car were large engines, including a standard  V8 and an optional  V8 (standard after 1973). Though offering two of the largest displacement V8 engines ever installed in a production vehicle by Ford, the car's considerable weight combined with low power output caused by restrictive emissions technology resulted in modest performance. As might also be expected from installing a large-displacement V8 in a heavy car, fuel efficiency was poor. 

The big Thunderbirds were popular, with sales peaking at over 87,000 units in 1973 in spite of the 1973 oil crisis, but sales had slumped to less than 43,000 by 1975. Finishing off the generation, sales had an uptick to almost 53,000 units for 1976. Acknowledging increasing fuel prices and more stringent federal emissions standards, a new, downsized Thunderbird was to appear for 1977.

Seventh generation (1977–1979)

For the 1977 model year, the Thunderbird was shifted to the smaller  wheelbase chassis that underpinned the 1972–76 Ford Torino and its replacement, the LTD II which also debuted for 1977. Even being nearly 8 inches shorter than the 1975 Thunderbird (only 1.2 inches 217.7 vs 218.9 from the second model year 1973 of the sixth generation) it still looked large to the eye. It was not dramatically downsized, from 217.7 to 200.4 inches in length, until the next generation (model year 1980). Ford's first effort at downsizing the Thunderbird, in 1977, reflected rising demand for more fuel-efficient cars. This generation was a continuation of the 1974–1976 Ford Elite, Ford's first attempt at competing in the market created by the Pontiac Grand Prix and Chevrolet Monte Carlo. 

A substantial component of the weight reduction was in the drivetrain, where a small-block V8 replaced the heavier big-block V8s of previous years, and proved to be an outstanding performer. In California, the 351 was the standard engine, and the 400 was optionally available. For the first time, a wide, fixed "B" pillar was used, reflecting Detroit's discontinuation of the pillarless hardtop body designs. However, the door window glass remained frameless.

In 1978, Ford offered the "Diamond Jubilee Edition" Thunderbird to commemorate the company's 75th year as an auto manufacturer. This option package escalated the price of the car to almost US$12,000, virtually doubling the standard price. Naturally, it included every option available except for a moonroof and an engine block heater. A similar option package, called "Heritage", was available for 1979. Though this generation was the most successful in sales with over 955,000 examples produced in its three-year run, Ford sought to downsize the Thunderbird further, due to fuel-efficiency and emissions concerns, leading to a redesign for 1980. For the 1979 model year, the 400 cu in engine was no longer available.

Eighth generation (1980–1982)

Reflecting a further industry-wide adoption of smaller vehicle designs in the interest of improved fuel efficiency and emissions compliance, the Thunderbird was redesigned for 1980 on the compact Ford Fox platform, which first appeared only two years prior as the basis for the Ford Fairmont.

The squarish styling seen in the previous generation of the Thunderbird was favored for the new model, but now using a smaller car platform. Frameless door glass was discontinued in favor of a chrome metal frame. The combination of a low-output  Windsor V8 base engine and a C5 three-speed transmission with 2.26 rear gears meant the focus was on fuel efficiency.

A six-cylinder engine was made available for the first time in the Thunderbird's history in 1981, the  Thriftpower Six. 

For the 1982 model year, the straight-six was replaced with a more modern V6, the 3.8 L Essex as the Thunderbird's standard engine. It came equipped with a Motorcraft 2150 2V carburetor. The  V8 was optional. 

At 288,638 units produced between 1980 and 1982, the eighth generation of the Thunderbird was barely more successful than the final model year of the previous Thunderbird generation.

Ninth generation (1983–1988)

In response to the lackluster reception of the eighth-generation 1980–1982 Thunderbird, Ford executed a significant redesign for 1983. To power the new Thunderbird, the 3.8 L Essex V6 and the  V8 were carried over from the previous generation with the V8 engine gaining CFI electronic fuel injection in 1983, and the V6 in 1984 for US models, 1985 for Canadian models (which was in turn replaced by multipoint fuel injection on the V8 in 1986 and the V6 in 1988). All-new, and a Thunderbird first, was a turbocharged 2.3 L OHC four-cylinder engine featured in the 1983 Thunderbird Turbo Coupe. Another first was the availability of a five-speed manual transmission with the turbocharged four. In 1983, the higher trim model was the Heritage; this was renamed the Elan in 1984. Also, a Fila-branded model was introduced. In 1985, a special 30th Anniversary edition was available, with special Medium Regatta Blue Metallic paint, special graphics, and trim.

For 1987, the Thunderbird received a significant refresh complete with new sheet metal and a revised front fascia with aerodynamic composite headlamps. Mechanically, the car was mostly unchanged.

Tenth generation (1989–1997)

On December 26, 1988, a completely redesigned Thunderbird was introduced as a 1989 model along with the similar Mercury Cougar. The new Thunderbird was developed on Ford's MN12 (mid-sized North American Project 12) platform, which had been in development since 1984. Featuring a 9-inch (229 mm) longer wheelbase than the previous-generation Thunderbird and a four-wheel independent suspension, with short-and-long arms and a spring strut assembly in the front and multiple links in the rear, the car offered better handling and ride quality.

The 1989 Thunderbird was the first in the car's history not to offer a V8 engine, instead offering two different versions of Ford's 3.8 L Essex V6.

The naturally aspirated V6 came with an AOD four-speed automatic transmission as standard equipment. The AOD was optional on the Super Coupe and a M5R2 five-speed, Mazda-derived manual transmission was standard in the SC model.

The Super Coupe's engine had the same  displacement as the naturally aspirated V6, but most all internal components were upgraded to handle the increased torque and temperature generated due to the addition of a supercharger. Among the modifications, the engine block and heads were modified to enhance coolant flow, the crankshaft was upgraded to a fully counterweighted forged unit, the billet roller cam had a unique profile, and the pistons were made of a stronger hypereutectic alloy. The supercharger used was an Eaton M90 Roots style, designed for mounting atop the intake manifold.

In 1990 for the 1991 model year, a V8 was offered in the Thunderbird once again, slotting in between the standard and supercharged versions of the 3.8 L V6. The  V8 manufactured at the Cleveland Engine Plant #1 featured more power and torque relative to the last time the engine was used in the Thunderbird in 1988. For 1992, the one-year-only Thunderbird Sport model included a  V8 engine, the Super Coupe front fascia with fog lamps, and color-coordinated lower bodyside stripes.

In 1993, the 1994 model year Thunderbird received a substantial refresh, including stylistic changes inside and out and mechanical enhancements. In particular, the small block  was replaced with Ford's new Modular 4.6 L OHC V8, while the Super Coupe's supercharged V6 produced more power and torque. The performance increase is largely attributed to the tighter gap tolerance of the supercharger rotors allowed by the use of resin coating and a new high-flow supercharger case. The AOD automatic transmission was replaced by the also-new electronically controlled 4R70W four-speed automatic in all instances where the AOD was previously used in the Thunderbird.

In 1995, Ford did little to commemorate the Thunderbird's 40th anniversary. The Super Coupe model was discontinued. 

Minor changes for 1996 included reducing the number of available options. 

The last model of the tenth-generation Thunderbird rolled off the assembly line in Lorain, Ohio, on September 4, 1997.

Prior to the ending of the production line, Ford's Special Vehicle Engineering Division proposed a high-performance version of the tenth-generation Thunderbird. The SVE Thunderbird would have been based around a supercharged version of Ford's  DOHC 4.6L modular V-8 coupled to a six-speed manual transmission. Planned to enter production in 1996, Ford declined to produce the SVE Thunderbird and proceeded with the shutdown of the entire Thunderbird production line after the 1997 model year.

Eleventh generation (2002–2005)

After a five-year hiatus, Ford introduced the 2002 Thunderbird. Returning to the original formula for the Thunderbird, the latest version had a two-passenger convertible/removable hardtop configuration like the first-generation Thunderbird and styling strongly recalling the original. 

The 11th-generation Thunderbird was manufactured at Ford's Wixom Assembly Plant, sharing the Ford DEW platform with the Lincoln LS, Jaguar S-Type, and Jaguar XF. Though the Thunderbird's exterior styling was unique relative to the others, the instrument panel, steering wheel, and other trim pieces were borrowed from Lincoln LS. Complementing the extra power and torque provided by the AJ-35 V8, a manual shift feature for the five-speed automatic called SelectShift was available as an option in 2003 and later Thunderbirds. 

With sales dropping off significantly after its first model year, Ford ended Thunderbird production with the 2005 model year. The last Thunderbird was manufactured on July 1, 2005.

NASCAR
  

Thunderbirds first made inroads into NASCAR racing in the 1959 season. The combination of the second-generation body style and the newly available 430 CID V8 took drivers Curtis Turner, Johnny Beauchamp, "Tiger" Tom Pistone, and Cotton Owens to victory lane. In the 1960 season, most teams returned to using the conventional full-sized Ford body style, and the T-Bird made only sporadic appearances through the rest of the 1960s, with no additional wins.

Beginning in 1977, Thunderbird-bodied racecars replaced the Torino as Ford's primary body style in NASCAR, starting a trend of luxury coupe type body styles (eventually the 1981 Imperial would also be seen racing) being used as a sheet-metal source on the race track. Bobby Allison won 13 races with this car driving for owner Bud Moore in the 1977 through 1980 seasons, though the cars looked boxy and unaerodynamic. During 1981–1997, the downsized and aerodynamically clean Thunderbirds were successful in NASCAR stock car racing before they were replaced by Taurus-based bodies in 1998. Bill Elliott and Davey Allison, in particular, were successful with the cars, with Elliott winning the 1988 championship. Alan Kulwicki also won the championship in 1992 in a car nicknamed "Underbird", for his underdog status as a driver.

References

Further reading

External links 
 

 
Cars introduced in 1955
1960s cars
1970s cars
1980s cars
1990s cars
2000s cars
Convertibles
Coupés
Thunderbird
Motor vehicles manufactured in the United States
Muscle cars
Personal luxury cars
Rear-wheel-drive vehicles